Severstal Aircompany (Северсталь) is an airline with its head office on the property of Cherepovets Airport in Botovo village, Cherepovetsky District, Russia.

Destinations
As of July 2022, Severstal Aircompany operates services to the following scheduled destinations:

Anapa - Vityazevo Airport Seasonal
Apatity - Khibiny Airport
Cherepovets - Cherepovets Airport hub
Gelendzhik - Gelendzhik Airport Seasonal
Moscow - Moscow Domodedovo Airport
Moscow - Sheremetyevo International Airport
Murmansk - Murmansk Airport
Petrozavodsk - Besovets Airport
Ukhta - Ukhta Airport
Sochi - Adler-Sochi International Airport Seasonal
Saint Petersburg - Pulkovo Airport
Yekaterinburg - Koltsovo Airport

Former destinations
Following the 2022 Russian invasion of Ukraine, several countries closed their airspace to Russian aeroplanes, particularly in Western Europe; Severstal had to suspend several services. As of July 2022, there is no indication of their resumption.

Helsinki - Helsinki Airport

Paris - Orly Airport

Batumi - Batumi International Airport Seasonal

Berlin - Berlin Brandenburg Airport

Antalya - Antalya Airport

Fleet

The Severstal Air Company fleet comprises the following aircraft (as of July 2022):

References

External links

Severstal Air Company 

Airlines of Russia
Companies based in Vologda Oblast